Carl Ryves (14 July 1940 – 13 October 2022) was an Australian sailor. He competed in the Flying Dutchman event at the 1968 Summer Olympics.

References

External links
 

1940 births
2022 deaths
Australian male sailors (sport)
Olympic sailors of Australia
Sailors at the 1968 Summer Olympics – Flying Dutchman
Place of birth missing
20th-century Australian people